Deepak Chopra is a Canadian businessman who was, from January 18, 2011, until March 31, 2018, the president and chief executive officer of Canada Post Corporation. Chopra is a certified general accountant and a member of the Certified General Accountants of Ontario. In 2009, he was named a Fellow of the Certified General Accountants of Canada. He served from January 2011 to March 2018. Previously he was the President and chief executive officer of Pitney Bowes Canada and Latin America.

Chopra was appointed to these roles by  the Conservative government of Stephen Harper on January 18, 2011, for a five-year term from February 1, 2011, to January 31, 2016. Chopra took over the post from Stewart Bacon, who returned from retirement as interim president and CEO in July 2010 when then-CEO Moya Greene left to take over Britain's national carrier, the Royal Mail. This appointment was renewed by Harper's government in July 2015, just before the scheduled federal election in October 2015, for a five-year term starting February 2016 at an approximate salary of $500,000.
 
In 2013, Canada Post, led by Chopra, introduced the extremely unpopular plan of eliminating door-to-door delivery of mail and converting to "community mail boxes." This plan was opposed by all federal parties except the Conservatives during the Canadian Federal Election of 2015. The plan was stopped by the Liberal Party after they won the election.
 
Following the 2015 federal election, Chopra was asked to resign and re-apply for his position by the newly elected government of Justin Trudeau. Chopra refused in a letter written by Sian Matthews, chair of the board of directors for Canada Post. In the summer of 2017, he announced that he would be stepping down on March 31, 2018, three years before his term was originally due to expire. He was succeeded, on an interim basis, by Jessica McDonald, former CEO of BC Hydro, effective April 2, 2018.

References

External links
Biography of Deepak Chopra at Canada Post Corporation

Canada Post
Canadian accountants
Canadian chief executives
Canadian people of Indian descent
Living people
Place of birth missing (living people)
Delhi University alumni
Year of birth missing (living people)